Pete and Gladys is an American sitcom television series starring Harry Morgan and Cara Williams that aired on CBS on Mondays at 8:00 p.m. Eastern and Pacific time for two seasons, beginning on September 19, 1960. The last episode was broadcast on September 10, 1962.

Synopsis
One of CBS television's most popular and highly rated sitcoms of the 1950s, December Bride, starred Spring Byington and co-starred Harry Morgan as next-door neighbor Pete Porter. Pete spent most of his time complaining about his scatterbrained wife Gladys, who was unseen to viewers. In this spin-off series, Gladys emerges as the gorgeous redhaired comedienne Cara Williams. Pete is an insurance salesman, and the happy couple resides in Westwood, California.

Besides leading-man Peter, another carryover from December Bride during the first season was the character of Hilda Crocker (Verna Felton), a close equivalent of I Love Lucys Ethel Mertz; she appeared in 23 episodes. Frances Rafferty, another December Bride veteran, appeared in seven episodes of Pete and Gladys as Nancy (a different character from her role in the original series). Barbara Stuart had a recurring first-season role as Gladys' friend Alice, and Ernest Truex appeared in six episodes as Gladys' widowed father, "Pop".

Guest stars

 Jack Albertson
 Norman Alden
 Morey Amsterdam
 Eleanor Audley
 Raymond Bailey
 Majel Barrett
 Bea Benaderet
 Whitney Blake
 Willis Bouchey
 Frank Cady
 Harry Cheshire 
 Richard Deacon
 Fifi D'Orsay
 Donna Douglas
 Gale Gordon
 Sandra Gould
 Sterling Holloway
 Ron Howard
 Rodolfo Hoyos Jr.
 Marty Ingels
 Ted Knight
 Nancy Kulp
 Charles Lane
 Nan Leslie
 Howard McNear
 Carole Mathews
 Strother Martin
 Doris Packer
 Sue Randall
 Cesar Romero
 Sig Ruman
 Reta Shaw
 Doris Singleton
 Olan Soule
 Will Wright

Reception
Pete and Gladys never made it into the Nielsen ratings Top 30 during the course of its prime time run. After it ceased production, it was repeated as part of the CBS weekday-morning line up. It aired at 11:30 a.m. EST for two years from October 1, 1962 to October 2, 1964.

Williams was nominated for a 1962 Emmy Award for Outstanding Continued Performance by a Lead Actress in a Comedy Series. She lost to veteran Shirley Booth of NBC's Hazel.

Episode list

Season 1 (1960–61)

Season 2 (1961–62)

References

External links

 

1960 American television series debuts
1960s American sitcoms
1962 American television series endings
American television spin-offs
Black-and-white American television shows
CBS original programming
English-language television shows
Fictional married couples
Television duos
Television series about couples
Television series about marriage
Television series by CBS Studios
Television shows set in Los Angeles